Bruce Perry (born March 22, 1981) is a former American football running back in the National Football League (NFL) for the Philadelphia Eagles and in the Canadian Football League (CFL) for the Montreal Alouettes. He was the Atlantic Coast Conference Offensive Player of the Year as just a sophomore in 2001, but the rest of his career at the University of Maryland, College Park, and as a professional, was hampered by numerous injuries.

Early life
Perry is a Philadelphia native and attended George Washington High School. He also attended Cardinal Dougherty High School in Philadelphia.

College career
Perry played college football at the University of Maryland and started all 11 games as a sophomore.  That year, he rushed 219 times for 1,242 yards and ten touchdowns in addition to catching 40 passes for 359 yards and two touchdowns, leading Maryland to an ACC Championship and an appearance in the 2002 Orange Bowl.  He won ACC Offensive Player of the Year as the second non-senior to do so and was a second-team All-American.  Perry was also a first-team All ACC selection and was a finalist for the Doak Walker Award.  Perry ranked 19th in the NCAA in rushing yards per game and ninth in all purpose yards per game.  Against Wake Forest, Perry rushed for 276 yards.

In his junior year, Perry was out with an injury until an October game against Duke. He immediately injured himself in the Duke game, and did not start again for the rest of the season.  Perry appeared in five more games in 2002, averaging 4.7 yards per carry on the season.

As a senior, Perry started four games and played in nine.  He finished with 646 rushing yards despite being hampered by injuries all season.  Against Wake Forest, Perry had 25 carries for 237 yards and three touchdowns.  He finished his college career ranked fourth among Maryland's career rushing leaders.

Professional career

Philadelphia Eagles
Perry was drafted by the Eagles in the seventh round of the 2004 NFL Draft.  He spent his entire rookie season on injured reserve.  After the 2005 pre-season, he was placed on the practice squad.  Later in the season, he was activated and saw his first start in the final game of the regular season.

Perry appeared in the 2006 pre-season and sustained a serious concussion in the game.  Even though Perry made the team, he was converted to cornerback and then was cut in September when the Eagles signed veteran Dexter Wynn for depth at cornerback.  The team re-signed Perry to the practice squad.  He was released on January 2, 2007.

External links

1981 births
Living people
American football running backs
Players of American football from Philadelphia
Players of Canadian football from Philadelphia
Maryland Terrapins football players
Philadelphia Eagles players